The 2008 PBZ Zagreb Indoors was a tennis tournament played on indoor hard courts. It was the 3rd edition of the PBZ Zagreb Indoors, and was part of the International Series of the 2008 ATP Tour. It took place at Dom Sportova in Zagreb, Croatia, from 23 February through 1 March 2008.

The singles field was headlined by Doha semifinalist and recent South African Airways Open Challenger titlist Ivan Ljubičić, Rotterdam semifinalist Ivo Karlović, and Marseille quarterfinalist and Rotterdam semifinalist Gilles Simon. Also present in the field were Sydney semifinalist Fabrice Santoro, Chennai semifinalist Mario Ančić, Nicolas Mahut, Andreas Seppi and Janko Tipsarević.

Unseeded Sergiy Stakhovsky win the singles title.

Notable stories

Lucky loser wins title
Twenty-two-year-old Ukrainian Sergiy Stakhovsky, who entered the tournament as world number 209, became the first lucky loser to reach an ATP Tour final since Nicklas Kulti at Halle in 1999. In winning the title he became the first lucky loser to take a trophy home since Christian Miniussi at São Paulo in 1991, and only the fourth to do it in the history of the ATP Tour.

Champions

Singles

 Sergiy Stakhovsky def.  Ivan Ljubičić, 7–5, 6–4
It was Sergiy Stakhovsky's 1st career title.

Doubles

 Paul Hanley /   Jordan Kerr def.  Christopher Kas /  Rogier Wassen, 6–3, 3–6, [10–8]

References

External links
Official website
Singles draw
Doubles draw
Qualifying Singles draw

 
2008 ATP Tour